Bigger Than Barnum's is a 1926 American silent drama film directed by Ralph Ince and starring Ralph Lewis, George O'Hara, and Viola Dana.

Cast
 Ralph Lewis as Peter Blandin  
 George O'Hara as Robert Blandim 
 Viola Dana as Juanita Calles  
 Ralph Ince as Carl Ravelle  
 Lucille Mendez as Princess Bonita  
 Daniel Makarenko as Jack Ranglin  
 George Holt as Bill Hartnett  
 William Knight as Ringmaster  
 Rhody Hathaway as Doctor

References

Bibliography
 Quinlan, David. The Illustrated Guide to Film Directors. Batsford, 1983.

External links

AFI catalog

Poster and stills at silenthollywood.com

1926 films
Films directed by Ralph Ince
American silent feature films
1920s English-language films
American black-and-white films
Film Booking Offices of America films
1920s American films